The Seychelles women's national football team is the national team of the Seychelles. 

The national team, captained by Abby Boone, played in two eighty-minute long games in 2005 in a tournament hosted by Mauritius, with the Seychelles losing both matches. An official under-17 national team exists and had regular training sessions in 2006. 

The sport faces several development problems inside the country including a lack of popularity for the sport, and few female players and teams. Women have gained football leadership positions in the country with one coaching a men's team and another umpiring international matches. There are other development issues for the sport that are ones facing the whole of Africa.

History

The Seychelles Football Federation was founded in 1979, and became a FIFA affiliate in 1986. Women's football is represented in the federation by specific mandate and currently they employ one full-time employee to look after the women's game.

In 1985, almost no country in the world had a women's national football team including the Seychelles who did play in a single FIFA sanctioned match between 1950 and June 2012. In 2006, the country did not have an official FIFA recognised senior A team, a situation unchanged by 2009.

In 2005, they competed in a three nation tournament hosted by Mauritius, where all games were 80 minutes in length. They lost to Mauritius 1–4 and also to Réunion 0–9. Overall, they finished last, scoring only one goal in the competition. In 2005, Zambia was supposed to host a regional COSAFA women's football tournament, with ten teams agreeing to send teams including South Africa, Zimbabwe, Mozambique, Malawi, Seychelles, Mauritius, Madagascar, Zambia, Botswana, Namibia, Lesotho and Swaziland. Seychelles did not record a match in the event.

The country did not have a team competing in the 2010 African Women's Championship, or at the 2011 All Africa Games. In March 2012, the team was not ranked in the world by FIFA due to inactivity.

The country has an official under-17 team, the Seychelles women's national under-17 football team. In 2006, they had two training sessions a week but had yet to record an official FIFA recognised match.

Results and fixtures

The following is a list of match results in the last 12 months, as well as any future matches that have been scheduled.
Legend

2022

Players

Current squad
The following players were called up for the friendly matches against the Maldives and Saudi Arabia on 15, 18 and 20 February 2022. 
Caps and goals correct as of 27 February 2022

Recent call-ups
The following players have been called up to a Seychelles squad in the past 12 months.

Competitive record

FIFA Women's World Cup

Olympic Games

*Draws include knockout matches decided on penalty kicks.

Africa Women Cup of Nations

African Games

Regional

COSAFA Women's Championship

*Draws include knockout matches decided on penalty kicks.

See also

 Sport in Seychelles
 Football in Seychelles
 Women's football in Seychelles
 Seychelles men's national football team

References

External links
 Seychelles Football Federation official website
 Seychelles at FIFA.com

 
Seychelles
national